Utopia is the upcoming fourth studio album by American rapper Travis Scott. It is scheduled to be released through Cactus Jack Records and Epic Records in June 2023. The album will follow his third studio album Astroworld (2018) and will be his longest awaited/released project since then.

Background and recording
The title of the album was revealed in early July 2020 when Scott uploaded an Instagram post with the caption "Utopia". He further teased the "Utopia" title in a thank you letter on the second anniversary of Astroworld. In October, Scott continued to tease the album in a series of tweets.

Recording for the album began in 2019 with Scott posting updates throughout recording sessions on social media. In a 2021 interview with i-D, Scott said he has been working with new people while attempting to expand his sound and rapping new beats he has created recently.

Composition 
In a June 2021 interview with WWD, Scott described the sound of Utopia, stating "I'm in this new album mode where it's like psychedelic rock".

Songs
During the Cactus Jack for Dior Summer 2022 show, five new songs were featured including: "In My Head" featuring Swae Lee which leaked in August 2019 and was recorded in 2018 during Astroworld sessions, "Lost Forever" featuring James Blake and Westside Gunn, 2 untitled songs, and "Escape Plan" which was released on November 5, 2021 along with "Mafia" with J. Cole.

Release and promotion
On October 4, 2019, Scott released the single "Highest in the Room", which was accompanied by a music video directed by David Meyers. "Highest in the Room" debuted at number 1 on the US Billboard Hot 100, marking the song Scott's second number-one charted single since "Sicko Mode". A remix with Spanish singer Rosalía, and American rapper Lil Baby, the latter which debuted on Scott's Cactus Jack compilation album JackBoys in December. The song was previously teased on one of Kylie Jenner's Kylie Cosmetics advertisements.

On June 20, 2020, a snippet of an untitled song, coined "Vision" by fans, debuted on another Kylie Cosmetics advertisement. On July 20, Scott previewed a song with Young Thug titled "White Tee" on the tenth episode of Chase B's radio WAV Radio. On September 25, "White Tee" was released under the name "Franchise" featuring Young Thug, and M.I.A., which was accompanied by a music video directed by Scott himself. "Franchise" debuted at number 1 on the US Billboard Hot 100. The following month, it was remixed by Future with M.I.A.'s verse taken out. In October, Scott previewed a song with 21 Savage titled "Niagara Falls" and Bryson Tiller titled "Blunt Talk" on the twelfth episode of WAV Radio. "Niagara Falls" was released 2 years later on Metro Boomin's 2nd studio album, titled Heroes & Villians. It debuted at number 27 on the US Billboard Hot 100.

At Rolling Loud Miami on July 24, 2021, Scott debuted an unreleased new song titled "Escape Plan". The song was believed to be another track off Utopia. The song was eventually released as a single on November 5, 2021, along with "Mafia", which features guest vocals from J. Cole. The two tracks are speculated to be part of Scott's upcoming third solo mixtape Dystopia, which would be released before Utopia. The concert that was set to promote Dystopia ended up with the notorious Astroworld Festival crowd crush, that led to more than 10 deaths and hundreds of injuries, sparking worldwide controversies aimed at Scott. 

In August 2022, Scott announced a one week residency in the Zouk Nightclub in Las Vegas, known as the Road to Utopia from September 17 to September 24. The same month, Scott performed at The O2 Arena in London where he performed "God's Country" which was originally a Kanye West song from an early version of his album Donda but is speculated that Ye had given the song to Scott. In December, it was reported that the album and a world tour is scheduled for early 2023.

In February 2023, Scott revealed at the 2023 NBA All-Star Weekend event in Salt Lake City that Utopia would be released after Don Toliver, Sheck Wes, and SoFaygo's projects would release.

Film adaptation
In August 2021, Scott signed a picture deal with A24 and teased his own film based on the album.

References

Travis Scott albums
Cactus Jack Records albums
Epic Records albums
Upcoming albums
Psychedelic rock albums by American artists
Albums produced by Kanye West
Albums produced by Mike Dean (record producer)
Albums produced by Travis Scott
Albums produced by James Blake (musician)